Another Place is a piece of modern sculpture by British artist Antony Gormley located at Crosby Beach in Merseyside, England. It consists of 100 cast iron figures facing towards the sea. The figures are modelled on the artist's own naked body. The work proved controversial due to the naked statues but has increased tourism to the beach. After being exhibited at two other locations it was put on display at Crosby on 1 July 2005. After some controversy Sefton Metropolitan Borough Council decided on 7 March 2007 that the sculptures should be permanently installed at the beach.

Construction and history

The work consists of cast iron figures which face out to sea, spread over a  stretch of beach between Waterloo and Blundellsands. The figures are cast replicas of Gormley's own body. As the tides ebb and flow, the figures are revealed and submerged by the sea, and are subject to corrosion by seawater and colonisation by marine animals. The figures were cast at Hargreaves Foundry in Halifax, West Yorkshire and the Joseph and Jesse Siddons Foundry in West Bromwich by foundryman Derek Alexander.

Public reception

Another Place was first exhibited on the beach of Cuxhaven, Germany, in 1997 followed by Stavanger in Norway and De Panne in Belgium. It was the subject of much controversy in Merseyside, although many people considered the figures to be beautiful pieces of art, and tourism in the local area increased.

Originally, the statues were due to be relocated in November 2007. Those who use the beach for watersports were among the most vocal in their resistance to the figures remaining, citing safety concerns. The coastguard also expressed safety concerns, fearing that tourists could become stuck in soft sand and get cut off by the tide. Conservationists, meanwhile, complained that bird-feeding areas had been compromised by the increased tourist traffic. Art lovers and local businesses, on the other hand, lobbied for the statues to stay. Gormley himself supported the proposal to keep the statues at Crosby Beach, saying the location was "ideal".

In October 2006, the local council refused to give permission for the statues to stay. The company Another Place Ltd was established to campaign for the figures' permanent installation and appealed the council's decision.

In March 2007, permission was granted for Another Place to remain at Crosby Beach permanently. The approved plan provided for 16 statues to be moved from contentious areas and decreased the installation's area from 232 to 195 hectares. The cost of the work was estimated at £194,000, to be paid by Another Place Ltd with funding from sources including The Northern Way and Northwest Development Agency.

In a press release, the Chief Executive of Sefton Metropolitan Borough Council, Graham Haywood, said, "Despite some controversy, this internationally renowned artwork has aroused national and international public and media support ... The Iron Men have placed Crosby and Sefton firmly in the spotlight and the knock-on benefits of this should be felt for years to come."

In 2012, biologists from the University of Liverpool studied the colonisation of the statues by sessile intertidal organisms, such as invasive species of barnacles.

See also

Event Horizon - also by Gormley, an installation of 31 statues on buildings around London
Horizon Field - another work by Gormley, consisting of 100 statues placed across  in the Austrian Alps

References

External links

  Gormley's web site.
 Guardian article on Another Place and Gormley
 Liverpool Echo report on plans to retain Another Place at Crosby

Tourist attractions in Merseyside
Metropolitan Borough of Sefton
Outdoor sculptures in England
1997 sculptures
Sculptures by Antony Gormley
Iron sculptures in the United Kingdom
Cast-iron sculptures